Robert Daniel Leaf (February 20, 1936 – October 11, 2005) was an American composer''.

Robert Daniel Leaf was born and raised in Lindsborg, Kansas. The son of Bernard and Judith (Valine) Leaf, he attended Luther Academy and College in Wahoo, Nebraska, played trumpet in the Air Force band, and completed his undergraduate degree at MacPhail School of Music in Minneapolis, Minnesota.

After a short career as an elementary school music teacher and a series of records of Children's music; he enrolled in graduate studies in composition at the University of Minnesota.  Having nearly completed the program, he left school and began composing hymns and secular choral music from the home he shared with his wife and three children in suburban Brooklyn Park, Minnesota.

He was especially interested in music for hymns and was completing a book on the subject at the time of his death. In particular, he had a belief in the value of hymn as one of the last commonplace examples of community singing outside of 'The Birthday Song' and The National Anthem.

He wrote both instrumental and vocal music and was published by AMSI, Augsburg, Choristers Guild, GIA and Kjos. Much of his late music included solo instrumental additions to choral arrangement. He had an innate understanding of church music, and wrote in a style that complemented worship. 
 
His wife of 43 years, Barbara (Harmon) Leaf died on March 28, 2005. They had three sons: Eryc, Andrew and John.

1936 births
2005 deaths
University of Minnesota College of Liberal Arts alumni
People from Lindsborg, Kansas
American male composers
20th-century American composers
20th-century American male musicians
Schoolteachers from Kansas